Melluži is a residential area and neighbourhood of the city Jūrmala, Latvia.

History 
An inn existed in Melluži in the 17th century. In 1827, Baron Karl Fircks build a Kurhaus (spa house) near the inn. Subsequently, the village became known to 
western visitors as Karlsbad. Plots for summer houses were leased from 1836. 

The Melluži railway station was established in 1914.

Gallery

References

External links 

Neighbourhoods in Jūrmala